In mathematics, the geometric Langlands correspondence is a reformulation of the Langlands correspondence obtained by replacing the number fields appearing in the original number theoretic version by function fields and applying techniques from algebraic geometry. The geometric Langlands correspondence relates algebraic geometry and representation theory.

History
In mathematics, the classical Langlands correspondence is a collection of results and conjectures relating number theory and representation theory. Formulated by Robert Langlands in the late 1960s, the Langlands correspondence is related to important conjectures in number theory such as the Taniyama–Shimura conjecture, which includes Fermat's Last Theorem as a special case. Establishing the Langlands correspondence in the number theoretic context has proven extremely difficult. As a result, some mathematicians have posed the geometric Langlands correspondence.

Connection to physics
In a paper from 2007, Anton Kapustin and Edward Witten described a connection between the geometric Langlands correspondence and S-duality, a property of certain quantum field theories.

In 2018, when accepting the Abel Prize, Langlands delivered a paper reformulating the geometric program using tools similar to his original Langlands correspondence.

Notes

References

External links

Quantum geometric Langlands correspondence at nLab

Algebraic geometry
Langlands program
Representation theory